Sura İskenderli (born 1994) is an Azerbaijani-born Turkish pop singer and songwriter. Her breakthrough came with her songs "Bir Daha Yak" and "Yaram Derinden", which were popular hits in Turkey. In 2019, "Bir Daha Yak" received a nomination as the Song of the Year in Golden Butterfly Awards. In February 2020, she received the Best Debut by a Pop Singer award at the 4th Music Stars Awards.

Discography

EPs 
 Korkularım (2019)

Singles 
 "Niye" (2019)
 "Yaram Derinden" (2019)
 "Dön" (2019)
 "Yalanlar" (2019)
 "Möhtaç" (2019)
 "Korkularım" (2019)
 "Bir Daha Yak" (2019)
 "Hayalet" (2020)
 "Dinle"(2020)
 "Taştan Yürek" (2020)
 "Karanlık" (2021)
 "Sen Al Canımı" (2021)
 "Kandırma" (2021)
 "Yok" (2021)
 "Sen Olmadan" (with Lil Orxan) (2021)
 "Sezenler Olmuş" (Yeni Türkü Zamansız) (2022)

References

External links 
 
 
 Sura İskenderli on Spotify

Living people
1994 births
Turkish lyricists
Turkish people of Azerbaijani descent
21st-century Turkish women singers